Kronprinsessegade 20 is a Neoclassical property overlooking one of the entrances to Rosenborg Castle Garden in central Copenhagen, Denmark. It was listed on the Danish registry of protected buildings and places in 1945.

History
 
Kronprinsessegade 20 was built by city builder Jørgen Henrich Rawert and Andreas Hallander in 1805–1806. Christian Zartmann (1793-1853), a military officer,  lived in the building in 1827. The naval officer C. D. von Hegerman-Lindencrone (1807-1893) was a resident in both 1830 and 1832.

 
Alfred Hage, who had become a partner in H. Puggaard & Co. a few years earlier,  lived in the building from 1843 to 1848. Hage was involved with the National Liberal movement and wrote for the magazine Fædrelandet.When the slesvig-holsten deputation came to Copenhagen in March 1848, Hage invited them to stay in his home in Kronprinsessegade. Studenterkorpset placed guards outside the building.

The lawyer and politician C. C. W. Liebe (1820-1900) was a resident in 1850.

The building was in 1860 acquired by master carpenter and director of the Copenhagen Fire Department Julius Blom. His father Thomas Blom had together with his brothers and mother as Bloms Enke & Sønner in the beginning of the century constructed the nearby buildings at the corner of Kronprinsessegade and Dronningens Tværgade. He owned the property until his death in 1900.

Architecture
 
Kronprinsessegade 20 is seven bays wide and has slightly progressing, one-bay corner risalits at each end. The wall between the two corner risalits has grey dressing on the high cellar while the upper three floors stand in red-painted, blank brick. The windows of the corner risalits on the bottom floor have framing and are topped by triangular pediments. The windows of the two corner risalits on the second floor are surrounded by rusticated framing while there are semi-curcilar Tympana over the five central windows. The roof is a slate-clad Mansard roof with seven dormers and five chimneys. An attica was removed in the middle of the 19th century. Under the roof runs a white-painted cornice supported by brackets.

A rather clumpsy iron canopy over the gateway of the building doubles as a balcony on the first floor.

The gateway opens to a narrow courtyard. A four-storey, six-bay side wing extends from the rear side of the building along the north side of the courtyard. A nine-bay rear wing is located at the bottom of the courtyard.

References

Rxternal links

Listed residential buildings in Copenhagen
Buildings and structures associated with the Hage family
Andreas Hallander buildings